is a  long motorway in southern Germany, originally intended to connect Weil am Rhein with the A 8 near Irschenberg.

Currently, only three relatively short unconnected sections have been constructed:

Weil am Rhein to near Eichsel, where the road diverges south to become the A 861 towards Rheinfelden (Baden) and the Swiss border;
east of Waldshut-Tiengen to north of Lauchringen; and
north of Singen to north of Überlingen.

Exit list 

 
  

 

 

 

 

 

 

 
|-
|colspan="3"|

 

 

 

 

|-
|colspan="2" style="text-align:Center;"||| to Überlingen
|}

External links 

98
A098